Karve may refer to:

 Karve (ship), a type of small Viking ship
 Majare Karve, a village in Maharashtra, India
 Karve (surname), an Indian surname
 Maharshi Karve Stree Shikshan Samstha, an Indian education society